Peršėkė  is a river of  Alytus district municipality, Alytus County, southern Lithuania. It flows for 66 kilometres and has a basin area of 542 km².

It begins near Gervėnai village and crosses the Lake Obelija at upper course. There is a water reservoir on Peršėkė near Krokialaukis. The most important settlements near Peršekė are Krokialaukis and Balbieriškis. Peršėkė joins the river Neman from its left side.

References
 LIETUVOS RESPUBLIKOS UPIŲ IR TVENKINIŲ KLASIFIKATORIUS (Republic of Lithuania- River and Pond Classifications).  Ministry of Environment (Lithuania). Accessed 2011-11-11.

Rivers of Lithuania
Alytus District Municipality